Francis Oag Hulme-Moir  (30 January 1910, Balmain, Sydney, Australia – 10 March 1979, Sydney) was an Australian Anglican bishop and military chaplain, who served as the 7th Anglican Bishop of Nelson from 1954 to 1965, as Bishop to the Armed Forces from 1965 to 1975, as Dean of Sydney from 1965 to 1967 and coadjutor bishop of Sydney from 1965 to 1975.

Hulme-Moir was born on 30 January 1910,  educated at Sydney Technical High School and ordained in 1937. He was a Chaplain  to the Australian Armed Forces from  then until 1947 when he became Archdeacon of Ryde. On 11 June 1954 he was ordained to the episcopate. On 23 February 1965, he was appointed 6th Dean of Sydney a post he relinquished in late 1966 but remained coadjutor bishop.  Hulme-Moir was particularly noted for his booming bass voice and engaging personality.

Hulme-Moir received the Order of Australia in 1976.

He died on 10 March 1979 and his funeral was attended by full military honours.

References

1910 births
1979 deaths
20th-century Anglican bishops in New Zealand
Anglican bishops of Nelson
Anglican bishops to the Australian Defence Force
Assistant bishops in the Anglican Diocese of Sydney
Deans of Sydney
New Zealand military chaplains
Officers of the Order of Australia
People educated at Sydney Technical High School